Lai Ruoyu (January 1, 1910 – May 20, 1958) was a People's Republic of China politician. He was born in Wutai County, Shanxi Province. He joined the Chinese Communist Party in 1929. He was the Chinese Communist Party Committee Secretary of his home province from September 1950 to October 1952 and Governor from February 1951 to May 1952. He died of illness in Beijing.

1910 births
1958 deaths
People's Republic of China politicians from Shanxi
Chinese Communist Party politicians from Shanxi
Governors of Shanxi
Politicians from Xinzhou
Members of the 8th Central Committee of the Chinese Communist Party
Members of the Standing Committee of the 1st National People's Congress
Eighth Route Army generals
Members of the 2nd Chinese People's Political Consultative Conference
Chinese trade unionists
Communist Party Committee Secretaries of Taiyuan
Deputy Communist Party secretaries of Shanxi
People from Wutai County